Ernest Thomas Sinton Walton (6 October 1903 – 25 June 1995) was an Irish physicist and Nobel laureate.  He is best known for his work with John Cockcroft to construct one of the earliest types of particle accelerator, the Cockcroft–Walton generator.  In experiments performed at Cambridge University in the early 1930s using the generator, Walton and Cockcroft became the first team to use a particle beam to transform one element to another. According to their Nobel Prize citation: "Thus, for the first time, a nuclear transmutation was produced by means entirely under human control."

Early years
Ernest Walton was born in Abbeyside, Dungarvan, County Waterford to a Methodist minister father, Rev John Walton (1874–1936) and Anna Sinton (1874–1906). In those days a general clergyman's family moved once every three years, and this practice carried Ernest and his family, while he was a small child, to Rathkeale, County Limerick (where his mother died) and to County Monaghan. He attended day schools in counties Down and Tyrone, and at Wesley College Dublin before becoming a boarder at Methodist College Belfast in 1915, where he excelled in science and mathematics.

In 1922 Walton won scholarships to Trinity College Dublin for the study of mathematics and science, and would go on to be elected a Foundation Scholar in 1924. He was awarded bachelor's and master's degrees from Trinity in 1926 and 1927, respectively. During these years at college, Walton received numerous prizes for excellence in physics and mathematics (seven prizes in all), including the Foundation Scholarship in 1924. Following graduation he was awarded an 1851 Research Fellowship from the Royal Commission for the Exhibition of 1851 and was accepted as a research student at Trinity College, Cambridge, under the supervision of Sir Ernest Rutherford, Director of Cambridge University's Cavendish Laboratory. At the time there were four Nobel Prize laureates on the staff at the Cavendish lab and a further five were to emerge, including Walton and John Cockcroft. Walton was awarded his PhD in 1931 and remained at Cambridge as a researcher until 1934.

During the early 1930s Walton and John Cockcroft collaborated to build an apparatus that split the nuclei of lithium atoms by bombarding them with a stream of protons accelerated inside a high-voltage tube (700 kilovolts). The splitting of the lithium nuclei produced helium nuclei. They went on to use Boron and Carbon as targets for their 'disintegration' experiments, and to report artificially induced radioactivity. These experiments provided verification of theories about atomic structure that had been proposed earlier by Rutherford, George Gamow, and others. The successful apparatus – a type of particle accelerator now called the Cockcroft-Walton generator – helped to usher in an era of particle-accelerator-based experimental nuclear physics. It was this research at Cambridge in the early 1930s that won Walton and Cockcroft the Nobel Prize in physics in 1951.

Career at Trinity College Dublin
Ernest Walton returned to Ireland in 1934 to become a Fellow of Trinity College Dublin in the physics department, and in 1946 was appointed Erasmus Smith's Professor of Natural and Experimental Philosophy. Walton's lecturing was considered outstanding as he had the ability to present complicated matters in simple and easy-to-understand terms. His research interests were pursued with very limited resources, yet he was able to study, in the late 1950s, the phosphorescent effect in glasses, secondary-electron emissions from surfaces under positive-ion bombardment, radiocarbon dating and low-level counting, and the deposition of thin films on glass.

Walton was associated with the Dublin Institute for Advanced Studies for over 40 years,  where he served long periods on the board of the School of Cosmic Physics and on the council of the Institute.  Following the 1952 death of John J. Nolan, the inaugural chairman of the School of Cosmic Physics, Walton assumed the role, and served in that position until 1960, when he was succeeded by John H. Poole.

Later years and death
Although he retired from Trinity College Dublin in 1974, he retained his association with the Physics Department at Trinity up to his final illness. Shortly before his death he marked his lifelong devotion to Trinity by presenting his Nobel medal and citation to the college. Ernest Walton died in Belfast on 25 June 1995, aged 91. He is buried in Deansgrange Cemetery, Dublin.

Family life
Ernest Walton married Winifred Wilson, a Methodist minister's daughter, in 1934. Their four children are Alan Walton (a physicist at the University of Cambridge), Marian Woods, Philip Walton (Professor of Applied Physics, NUI Galway), and Jean Clarke. He served on a committee of Wesley College, Dublin.

Religious views
Raised as a Methodist, Walton has been described as someone who was strongly committed to the Christian faith. He gave lectures about the relationship of science and religion in several countries after he won the Nobel Prize, and he encouraged the progress of science as a way to know more about God.

Walton is quoted as saying:

Walton held an interest in topics about the government and the Church, and after his death, the organisation Christians in Science Ireland established the  Walton Lectures on Science and Religion (an initiative similar to the Boyle Lectures). David Wilkinson, Denis Alexander, and others have given Walton Lectures in universities across Ireland.

Along with Lochlainn O'Raifeartaigh and Michael Fry, Walton helped found the Irish Pugwash group, opposing the nuclear weapons race.

Honours
Walton and John Cockcroft were recipients of the 1951 Nobel Prize in Physics for their "work on the transmutation of the atomic nuclei by artificially accelerated atomic particles" (popularly known as splitting the atom). They are credited with being the first to disintegrate the lithium nucleus by bombardment with accelerated protons (or hydrogen nuclei) and identifying helium nuclei in the products in 1930. More generally, they had built an apparatus which showed that nuclei of various lightweight elements (such as lithium) could be split by fast-moving protons.

Walton and Cockcroft received the Hughes Medal of the Royal Society of London in 1938. In much later years – predominantly after his retirement in 1974 – Walton received honorary degrees or conferrals from numerous Irish, British, and North American institutions.

The "Walton Causeway Park" in Walton's native Dungarvan was dedicated in his honour with Walton himself attending the ceremony in 1989. After his death the Waterford Institute of Technology named a building the ETS Walton Building and a plaque was placed on the site of his birthplace.

Other honours for Walton include the Walton Building at Methodist College Belfast, the school where he had been a boarder for five years, and a memorial plaque outside the main entrance to Methodist College. Wesley College in Dublin, where he attended and for many years served as chairman of the board of Governors, established the Walton Prize for Physics,  and a prize with the same name at Methodist College is awarded to the pupil who obtains the highest marks in A Level Physics. There is also a scholarship in Waterford named after Walton. In 2014, Trinity College Dublin set up the Trinity Walton Club, an extracurricular STEM Education centre for teenagers.

References

Further reading

External links

 
 Ernest Thomas Sinton Walton: Memorial Discourse by Dr. Vincent McBrierty, 16 April 2012
 Annotated bibliography for Ernest Walton from the Alsos Digital Library for Nuclear Issues
 Ernest Thos S Walton 1911 Census of Ireland.
 
  BBC Archive – an interview with Professor Ernest Walton Recorded 1985, duration 43min.
The Papers of E T S Walton held at Churchill Archives Centre

1903 births
1995 deaths
Academics of Trinity College Dublin
Alumni of Trinity College Dublin
Alumni of Trinity College, Cambridge
20th-century Anglo-Irish people
Burials at Deans Grange Cemetery
Experimental physicists
Irish Methodists
Irish Nobel laureates
Irish physicists
Irish Protestants
Nobel laureates in Physics
People educated at Cookstown High School
People educated at Methodist College Belfast
People educated at Wesley College, Dublin
People from Dungarvan
Scholars of Trinity College Dublin
20th-century physicists
20th-century Irish people